The ECOWAS passport is a common passport document for several countries in West Africa.

Member states of ECOWAS — the Economic Community of West African States — have implemented the common design for the passport. It was created to facilitate the intra-regional travel of member states' citizens for periods of unlimited duration. The passport can be used within the sub-region and is also recognized for international travel.

Types 

There are three types of ECOWAS passports:

 Ordinary passport  These passports are issued to citizens and are intended for occasional travel, such as vacations and business trips. They contain 32 pages, and are valid for 5 years.

 Official/Service passport  These passports are issued to officials attached to government institutions who have to travel on official business.

 Diplomatic passport  Issued to diplomats and consuls for work-related travel, and to their accompanying dependents.

Common design features

Overall format
Paper size B7 (ISO/IEC 7810 ID-3, 88 mm × 125 mm)
32 pages (passports with more pages can be issued to frequent travelers)
Colour of cover: green, blue and burgundy (depending on type of passport)

Cover
The Economic Community of West African States (ECOWAS) itself does not issue passports, but the passports issued by its 15 members share certain design features. These include the green coloured cover for ordinary passports, blue colored cover for service passports, and burgundy colored cover for diplomatic passports, as well as common security features and biometrics.

Additional common features include the inscription of the words ECONOMIC COMMUNITY OF WEST AFRICAN STATES (ECOWAS), French: COMMUNAUTÉ ÉCONOMIQUE DES ÉTATS DE L’AFRIQUE DE L’OUEST (CEDEAO), depending on the language of the issuing state. While the emblem of the ECOWAS community is emblazoned on the cover page of some passports, it is possible to notice some ECOWAS passports of certain countries with the respective state’s emblem on the cover instead. The name of the issuing country is usually the only distinguishing factor between passports issued by the various sovereign nations of the sub-region.

Near the bottom of the passport cover, depending on the official language of the issuing state, the words PASSPORT, French: PASSEPORT are inscribed on ordinary passports, OFFICIAL PASSPORT or SERVICE PASSPORT, French: PASSEPORT DE SERVICE on service passports; and DIPLOMATIC PASSPORT, French: PASSEPORT DIPLOMATIQUE on diplomatic passports.

Identification page
The following information is printed on the identification page, in both English and French:

 Type 
 Code of Issuing State
 Passport No.
 Surname
 Given name(s)
 Nationality
 Date of birth
 Sex
 Place of birth
 Date of issue
 Date of expiry
 Authority

Overview of passports issued by the ECOWAS states

See also 
African Union Passport

References 

Economic Community of West African States
Passports